Yefimovo is a rural locality (a village) in Verkhnetoyemsky District, Arkhangelsk Oblast, Russia. The population was 19 as of 2010.

Geography 
Yefimovo is located on the Pinega River, 122 km northeast of Verkhnyaya Toyma (the district's administrative centre) by road. Sogra is the nearest rural locality.

References 

Rural localities in Verkhnetoyemsky District